The 2020 Open de Rennes was a professional tennis tournament played on hard courts. It was the fourteenth edition of the tournament and part of the 2020 ATP Challenger Tour. It took place in Rennes, France between 20 and 26 January 2020.

Singles main-draw entrants

Seeds

1 Rankings are as of 13 January 2020.

Other entrants
The following players received wildcards into the singles main draw:
  Dan Added
  Evan Furness
  Kyrian Jacquet
  Jerzy Janowicz
  Valentin Royer

The following players received entry into the singles main draw as alternates:
  Alessandro Bega
  Antoine Escoffier
  Patrik Niklas-Salminen

The following players received entry from the qualifying draw:
  Corentin Denolly
  Teymuraz Gabashvili

Champions

Singles

 Arthur Rinderknech def.  James Ward 7–5, 6–4.

Doubles

 Antonio Šančić /  Tristan-Samuel Weissborn def.  Teymuraz Gabashvili /  Lukáš Lacko 7–5, 6–7(5–7), [10–7].

References

2020
2020 ATP Challenger Tour
2020 in French tennis
January 2020 sports events in France